David Drury (born 1961) is a musician in Sydney, Australia. He was formerly organist at St James Church, King Street, and has given recitals in Westminster Abbey, St Paul's and Westminster cathedrals in London, King's College, Cambridge and Notre Dame de Paris and La Madeleine in Paris.

Drury won the 1987 Improvisation Competition at the St Albans International Organ Festival.

He has released four solo recordings as well as recordings with the Sydney Symphony Orchestra and Cantillation.

He has been Director of Music at St Paul's College, University of Sydney since 1992.

References

External links 
Official website

1961 births
Australian musicians
Australian classical organists
Male classical organists
Living people
21st-century organists
21st-century Australian male musicians
21st-century Australian musicians